The smoky bush tyrant (Myiotheretes fumigatus) is a species of bird in the family Tyrannidae.

It is found in the northern Andes of Colombia, Ecuador, Peru and Venezuela. Its natural habitat is subtropical or tropical moist montane forests.

References

smoky bush tyrant
Birds of the Northern Andes
smoky bush tyrant
Taxonomy articles created by Polbot